The Wonderful Adventures of Guerrin Meschino is a 1952 Italian adventure film directed by Pietro Francisci. It is based in part on the 1410 chivalric romance Il Guerrin Meschino.

Cast

 Gino Leurini as  Guerrin Meschino
 Leonora Ruffo as Elisenda
 Tamara Lees as  Maga Alcina
 Aldo Fiorelli as  Alessandro
 Anna Di Leo as  Costanza
 Cesare Fantoni as King Murad
 Sergio Fantoni as  Selim
 Antonio Amendola as  Brunello
 Giacomo Giuradei as  Pinamonte
 Gian Paolo Rosmino as The Magician
 Camillo Pilotto
 Ugo Sasso
 Franco Silva

References

External links
 

1952 films
1952 adventure films
Italian adventure films
1950s Italian-language films
Films directed by Pietro Francisci
Films scored by Nino Rota
Films set in the Middle Ages
Italian black-and-white films
1950s Italian films